X is the debut studio album released by the melodic hard rock band Ten.

Track listing
All songs written by Gary Hughes except where noted.
 "The Crusades/It's All About Love" – 8:06 (Gary Hughes, Vinny Burns)
 "After the Love Has Gone" – 5:27
 "Yesterday Lies In the Flames" – 5:06
 "The Torch" – 5:25
 "Stay With Me" – 5:52
 "Close Your Eyes and Dream" – 6:24
 "Eyes of a Child" – 5:02
 "Can't Slow Down" – 5:29
 "Lamb to the Slaughter" – 4:50
 "Soliloquy/The Loneliest Place In the World" – 10:30
2015 japanese SHM-CD remaster (AVALON MICP-11208) bonus track:
"Beautiful Miss Understood" - 4:32

Personnel
Gary Hughes – lead and backing vocals
Vinny Burns – guitars
Greg Morgan – drums and percussion
Mark Harrison – bass guitar
Lee Goulding – keyboards
Howard Smith – keyboards
Andy Thompson – keyboards
Francis Cummings – first violin
Peter Leighton-Jones – first violin
John Wade – first violin
Fiona Payne – second violin
Julia Parsons – second violin
Jean Ambrose – viola
Anne Morrison – viola
Anna Frazer – cello

Production
Executive Producers – Mark Ashton and Vinny Burns
Mixing – Mike Stone
Engineer – Mike Stone, Audu Obaje, Ray Brophy, Gavin Fernie and Kirk Podmore

References

External links
Heavy Harmonies page

Ten (band) albums
1996 debut albums
Albums produced by Mike Stone (record producer)